The 1812 United States presidential election in Vermont took place between October 30 and December 2, 1812, as part of the 1812 United States presidential election. The state legislature chose eight representatives, or electors to the Electoral College, who voted for President and Vice President.

During this election, Vermont cast its eight electoral votes to Democratic Republican candidate and incumbent President James Madison. For the second time in the state's history, Vermont became the only state in New England to vote for Madison, as the other 4 New England states cast their electoral votes for Federalist supported candidate DeWitt Clinton.

See also
 United States presidential elections in Vermont

References

Vermont
1812
1812 Vermont elections